Duke Wu of Qin (died 678 BC) was from 697 to 678 BC the tenth ruler of the Zhou Dynasty state of Qin that eventually united China to become the Qin Dynasty.  His ancestral name was Ying, and Duke Wu was his posthumous title.

Accession to the throne
Duke Wu was the eldest son and the crown prince of Duke Xian of Qin. However, when Duke Xian died in 704 BC at the age of 21, the ministers Fuji (弗忌) and Sanfu (三父) deposed Duke Wu and installed his younger half-brother Chuzi on the throne. Six years later, in 698 BC Sanfu and Fuji assassinated Chuzi and put Duke Wu, the original crown prince, on the throne.

Reign
In 697 BC, the first year of Duke Wu's reign, Qin attacked the Pengxi tribe (彭戏氏) of the Rong people and the Qin army advanced east to Mount Hua.  In 695 BC, Duke Wu executed Sanfu, Fuji, and their clans for the crime of murdering Chuzi.  In 688 BC, he attacked the Rong people to the west, establishing counties in the former Rong territories of Gui (邽, in present-day Tianshui, Gansu) and Ji (冀, in present-day Gangu, Gansu).  The following year, he established the counties of Du (杜, in present-day Xi'an, Shaanxi) and Zheng (郑, in present-day Hua County, Shaanxi) in the east, and conquered the minor state of Xiao Guo.

Death and succession
After 20 years of reign, Duke Wu died in 678 BC and was buried in Yong (in present-day Fengxiang, Shaanxi).  Although Duke Wu had a son named Bai (白), he was succeeded by his younger brother Duke De of Qin as ruler of Qin.  Duke De moved the Qin capital to Yong, while Prince Bai was enfeoffed at the old capital Pingyang.

Human sacrifice
According to Sima Qian, Duke Wu was the ruler who started the practice of funeral human sacrifice in the state of Qin.  When he died in 678 BC he had 66 people buried with him.  The later ruler Duke Mu, who died in 621 BC, had 177 people buried with him, including several senior government officials.  This practice would continue for almost three centuries until Duke Xian (Shixi) banned it in 384 BC.

References

Year of birth unknown
Rulers of Qin
7th-century BC Chinese monarchs
678 BC deaths